Proceso Jaraza Alcala (born July 2, 1955), popularly known as "Procy" in his home province, is a Filipino politician. He is the longest serving Secretary of the Department of Agriculture, holding the position from 2010 to 2016 encompassing the entire term of President Benigno Aquino III. He was a two-term congressman of the 2nd District of Quezon Province from 2004 to 2010.

Education
Elementary : Lucena South Elementary School (1962-1968)
Secondary : Lucena City National High School (1968-1972)
College : Luzonian University Foundation; Bachelor of Science in Civil Engineering (1972-1978)

Political career
Alcala first served as a two-term congressman of the 2nd district of Quezon Province from 2004 to 2010. He is one of the principal authors of the Organic Agriculture Act of 2010 (RA 10068) and Mounts Banahaw-San Cristobal Protected Landscape Act (RA 2718). He was also a co-author of the Climate Change Act (RA 9729) and the Expanded Senior Citizens Act (RA 9994). He is an environmentalist and a non-government organization worker.

According to his curriculum vitae, Alcala pursued relentlessly his advocacy for and dedication to agricultural development, particularly organic agriculture in the Congress.

In 2010, President Benigno S. Aquino III appointed Alcala to the Agriculture secretary post, serving until 2016. Alcala was the highest paid Cabinet member, based on the 2013 report of salaries and allowances released by the Commission on Audit.

In 2019, almost three years after stepping down as Agriculture secretary, he attempted a comeback to the Congress, running for the 2nd district of Quezon. However, he lost to outgoing Governor David Suarez. He sought another comeback to the Congress in 2022, this time under the Nationalist People's Coalition, but lost to Suarez once again.

References

 

1955 births
Living people
People from Lucena, Philippines
Secretaries of Agriculture of the Philippines
Liberal Party (Philippines) politicians
Nationalist People's Coalition politicians
Members of the House of Representatives of the Philippines from Quezon
Benigno Aquino III administration cabinet members
Filipino Roman Catholics
Filipino civil engineers